Puca Allpa or Puka Allpa (Quechua puka red, allpa earth, "red earth", hispanicized spelling Puca Allpa) is a mountain in the Cordillera Negra in the Andes of Peru, about  high. It is situated in the Ancash Region, Aija Province, Aija District, and in the Recuay Province, on the border of the districts of Recuay and Ticapampa. Puca Allpa lies between Wank'ap'iti in the southeast and Pucairca in the northwest.

References

External links 

Mountains of Peru
Mountains of Ancash Region